Debbie Muggli (born August 14, 1964) is an American actress and female bodybuilder. She made her acting debut on the TV sitcom Martin and appeared in the films Nemesis 2: Nebula and Nemesis 3: Prey Harder.

Bodybuilding career

Amateur

Professional

Competition history

 1987 Lackland Championships - 1st (MW and overall)
 1988 Muscle Beach (Galveston) - 1st (MW and overall)
 1989 Lone Star Classic - 1st (HW and overall)
 1990 NPC National Juniors - 1st (HW and overall)
 1990 IFBB North American Championships - 1st (HW and overall)
 1991 IFBB Jan Tana Pro - 7th
 1991 IFBB Ms. International - 4th
 1992 IFBB Ms. International - 2nd 
 1992 IFBB Ms. Olympia - 10th
 1993 IFBB Ms. International - 2nd
 1993 IFBB Ms. Olympia - 4th
 1994 IFBB Ms. International - 2nd
 1994 IFBB Ms. Olympia - 4th
 1995 IFBB Ms. International - 3rd
 1995 IFBB Ms. Olympia - 6th

References

External links

Living people
American television actresses
American female bodybuilders
Professional bodybuilders
1964 births
21st-century American women